Claudio Bravo (born 1983) is a Chilean footballer.

Claudio Bravo may also refer to:

 Claudio Bravo (footballer, born 1997), Argentine footballer
 Claudio Bravo (painter) (1936–2011), Chilean painter